Philippe, Baron Vlerick (born 8 June 1955), is a Belgian businessman. He was born in Kortrijk, the son of Lucien Vlerick and Thérèse Vandewiele. He is a nephew of André Vlerick and married to Patricia Bouckaert.

Career
He is chairman and CEO of the denim producer Uco Textiles and also manages Bic Carpets, a manufacturer of designer carpets founded by his father in 1956. In 2005, he started on a strategic alliance with the Indian Raymond Group. In 2006, he was Manager of the Year in Belgium. He is a member of the board of directors of the Vlerick Business School and a Director of the KBC Group.

functions 
 Commisaris general of Europalia India
 President of the Belgo-Indian Chamber of Commerce & Industry" (BICC & I).

Honours 
 2008: Created Baron Vlerick, by command of King Albert.
 2013: commander in the Order of Leopold.

References

Sources
 DE VERANKERAARS VAN KBC GROEP: wie is wie? 
 Raad van bestuur nieuwe KBC Groep 

1955 births
Barons of Belgium
Belgian businesspeople
Living people